Waterfront Air is a Chinese airline started in 2008 with the aim of reintroducing seaplane services from Hong Kong's Victoria Harbour. In 2014 the airline ended plans for operating in Hong Kong and instead is focusing its operations in the Chinese mainland.

History
Waterfront Air was founded by Michael Agopsowicz and co-founded by Peter de Kantzow, who is the son of Sydney de Kantzow, the Australian co-founder of Cathay Pacific Airways.

Six years after the company began, Waterfront Air HK ceased operations on 23 December 2014 without any established routes, according to Hong Kong's Companies Registry record.

However, HaiXiang Air 海翔公務航空有限公司 will operate seaplane services in China under the English name Waterfront Air. HaiXiang Air received their AOC preliminary approval in China on 10 August 2015 from the CAAC South Central branch.

Proposed Routes

HaiXiang Air operating as Waterfront Air has planned routes between Hong Kong and Macau and Shenzhen, with estimated flight time of 20 minutes. There are additional plans to extend the services to Guangzhou and other parts of Shenzhen in the near future.

Waterfront Air's proposed destinations:

 People's Republic of China
 Guangzhou
 Shenzhen
 Shenzhen Airport Main hub
 Nan'ao
 Hong Kong
 Macau

Fleet

Waterfront Air plans to lease de Havilland DHC-6 Twin Otters, but no aircraft appeared to have been ordered or delivered.

Facilities

The airline had planned to use the old Kai Tak Airport adjacent to the Kai Tak Cruise Terminal in Victoria Harbour for operations in Hong Kong.

Progress

In February 2010, the airline reached an agreement with Shenzhen Airport Group to make Shenzhen the company's main base. On 6 January 2010, Waterfront Air signed a memorandum of understanding with the Shenzhen Airport Ferry Terminal Services Company Limited to operate seaplane services from Shenzhen Airport Ferry Pier to various destinations in the Greater Pearl River Delta.

On 1 April 2013, Waterfront Air concluded an agreement with the Shenzhen Dapeng Peninsula government to operate seaplane services from Nan'Ao.

In July, 2015, Viking Air announced the certification of the Twin Otter in China.

On 10 August 2015, HaiXiang Air received their AOC preliminary approval in China from the CAAC South Central branch.

References

External links 
 

Airlines of China
Defunct airlines of Hong Kong
Airlines established in 2008
Seaplane operators